Järlepa is a village in Rapla Parish, Rapla County, Estonia.

Between 1991–2017 (until the administrative reform of Estonian municipalities) the village was located in Juuru Parish. In 2010 Sadala village was detached from the lands of Järlepa and Lõiuse villages.

Järlepa manor
Järlepa was founded after 1688. The present building was erected in 1804 in a classicist style. It was devastated during the uprising in 1905 but later restored. During the Soviet occupation of Estonia, the manor house was used as the office of a collective farm. The most famous resident of the manor was dramatist August von Kotzebue, who acquired the estate in 1804. During his time, a small theatre was put up at the estate, and Kotzebue's plays were often performed.

See also
 Järlepa Lake
 List of palaces and manor houses in Estonia

References

Villages in Rapla County
Manor houses in Estonia
Kreis Harrien